Giovanni Doria may refer to:

 Giovanni Battista Doria (born 1487)
 Giovanni Andrea Doria (1539–1606), Italian admiral from Genoa
 Giovanni Doria (bishop) (1573–1642)
 Giovanni Carlo Doria (1576–1625), Genoan art collector and mecenas